Morristown is a town and the county seat of Morris County, in the U.S. state of New Jersey. Morristown has been called "the military capital of the American Revolution" because of its strategic role in the war for independence from Great Britain. Today this history is visible in a variety of locations throughout the town that collectively make up Morristown National Historical Park.

According to British colonial records, the first permanent settlement at Morristown occurred in 1715, when a settlement was founded as New Hanover by colonists from New York and Connecticut. Morris County was created on March 15, 1739, from portions of Hunterdon County. The county, and ultimately Morristown itself, was named for the popular Governor of the Province, Lewis Morris, who championed land ownership rights for colonists.

Morristown was incorporated as a town by an act of the New Jersey Legislature on April 6, 1865, within Morris Township, and it was formally set off from the township in 1895. As of the 2020 United States census, the town's population was 20,180, an increase of 1,769 (+9.6%) from the 2010 census count of 18,411, which in turn reflected a decline of 133 (−0.7%) from the 18,544 counted in the 2000 census.

History 

The area was inhabited by the Lenni Lenape Native Americans for up to 6,000 years prior to exploration of Europeans. The first European settlements in this portion of New Jersey were established by the Swedes and Dutch in the early 17th century, when a significant trade in furs existed between the natives and the Europeans at temporary posts. It became part of the Dutch colony of New Netherland, but the English seized control of the region in 1664, which was granted to Sir George Carteret and John Berkeley, 1st Baron Berkeley of Stratton, as the Province of New Jersey.

Eighteenth century
Morristown was settled around 1715 by English Presbyterians from Southold, New York on Long Island and New Haven, Connecticut as the village of New Hanover. The town's central location and road connections led to its selection as the seat of the new Morris County shortly after its separation from Hunterdon County on March 15, 1739. The village and county were named for Lewis Morris, the first and then sitting royal governor of a united colony of New Jersey.

By the middle of the 18th century, Morristown had 250 residents, with two churches, a courthouse, two taverns, two schools, several stores, and numerous mills and farms nearby.

George Washington first came to Morristown in May 1773, two years before the Revolutionary War broke out, and traveled from there to New York City together with John Parke Custis (his stepson) and Lord Stirling.

In 1777, General George Washington and the Continental Army marched from the victories at Trenton and Princeton to encamp near Morristown from January to May. Washington had his headquarters during that first encampment at Jacob Arnold's Tavern, located at the Morristown Green in the center of the town. Morristown was selected for its extremely strategic location. It was between Philadelphia and New York and near New England while being protected by the Watchung Mountains from the bulk of continental British forces camped in New York City. It also was chosen for the skills and trades of the residents, local industries and natural resources to provide arms, and what was thought to be the ability of the community to provide enough food to support the army.

The churches were used for inoculations for smallpox. It suffered a fire in 1918, and the original structure was demolished, but new buildings for the hospital were built directly across the street.

From December 1779 to June 1780 the Continental Army's second encampment at Morristown was at Jockey Hollow. Then, Washington's headquarters in Morristown was located at the Ford Mansion, a large mansion near what was then the edge of town. Ford's widow and children shared the house with Martha Washington and officers of the Continental Army.

The winter of 1780 was the worst winter of the Revolutionary War. The starvation was complicated by extreme inflation of money and lack of pay for the army. The entire Pennsylvania contingent successfully mutinied and later, 200 New Jersey soldiers attempted to emulate them (unsuccessfully). Many soldiers died, due to weak health.

During Washington's second stay, in March 1780, he declared St. Patrick's Day a holiday to honor his many Irish troops. Martha Washington traveled from Virginia and remained with her husband each winter throughout the war. The Marquis de Lafayette came to Washington in Morristown to inform him that France would be sending ships and trained soldiers to aid the Continental Army.

The Ford Mansion, Jockey Hollow, and Fort Nonsense are all preserved as part of Morristown National Historical Park managed by the National Park Service, which has the distinction among historic preservationists of being the first National Historical Park established in the United States.

During Washington's stay, Benedict Arnold was court-martialed at Dickerson's Tavern, on Spring Street, for charges related to profiteering from military supplies at Philadelphia. His admonishment was made public, but Washington quietly promised the hero, Arnold, to make it up to him.

Alexander Hamilton courted and wed Elizabeth Schuyler at a residence where Washington's personal physician was billeted. Locally known as the Schuyler-Hamilton House, the Dr. Jabez Campfield House is listed on both the New Jersey and National Register of Historic Places.

The Morristown Green has a statue commemorating the meeting of George Washington, the young Marquis de LaFayette, and young Alexander Hamilton depicting them discussing forthcoming aid of French tall ships and troops being sent by King Louis XVI of France to aid the Continental Army.

Morristown's Burnham Park has a statue of the "Father of the American Revolution", Thomas Paine, who wrote the pamphlet Common Sense, which urged a complete break from British rule.  The bronze statue, by sculptor Georg J. Lober, shows Paine in 1776 (using a drum as a table during the withdrawal of the army across New Jersey) composing Crisis 1. He wrote, "These are the times that try men's souls..." The statue was dedicated on July 4, 1950.

Nineteenth century 

The idea for constructing the Morris Canal is credited to Morristown businessman George P. Macculloch, who in 1822 convened a group to discuss his concept for a canal. The group included Governor of New Jersey Isaac Halstead Williamson, which led to approval of the proposal by the New Jersey Legislature later that year. The canal was used for a century.
In July 1825 during his 15 month return tour of the United States, the Marquis de Lafayette returned to Morristown, where a ball was held in his honor at the 1807 Sansay House on DeHart Street (the edifice still stands as of 2011).

In 1827, St. Peter's Episcopal Church was founded at the behest of Bishop George Washington Doane and many prominent Morristown Families, including George P. Macculloch, of the Morris Canal. When the Church was rebuilt by the then-internationally famous architectural firm, McKim, Mead and White, beginning in 1889, the congregation erected one of the United States finest church buildings –a stone, English-gothic church complete with fined stained glass, and a long, decorated interior.

Antoine le Blanc, a French immigrant laborer, murdered the Sayre family and their servant (or possibly slave), Phoebe. He was tried and convicted of murder of the Sayres (but not of Phoebe) on August 13, 1833. On September 6, 1833, Le Blanc became the last person hanged on the Morristown Green. Until late 2006, the house where the murders were committed was known as "Jimmy's Haunt," which is purported to be haunted by Phoebe's ghost because her murder never saw justice. Jimmy's Haunt was torn down to make way for a bank in 2007.

Samuel F. B. Morse and Alfred Vail built the first telegraph at the Speedwell Ironworks in Morristown on January 6, 1838. The first telegraph message was A patient waiter is no loser. The first public demonstration of the invention occurred five days later as an early step toward the information age.

Jacob Arnold's Tavern, the first headquarters for Washington in Morristown and site of Benedict Arnold's 1780 trial, was purchased by Morristown historian Julia Keese Nelson Colles (1840-1913) to save it from demolition in 1886. It became a boarding house for four years until it was converted by the Grey Nuns from Montreal into All Souls' Hospital, the first general hospital in Morris County. George and Martha Washington's second floor ballroom became a chapel and the first floor tavern became a ward for patients. In 1910, the late Augustus Lefebvre Revere (brother of hospital founder Paul Revere) willed the Hospital $10,000 to be used for the erection of a new building. This fund was used 8 years later when the original Arnold's Tavern building was lost to a fire. The entire organization, nurses, doctors, and patients of All Souls' Hospital were then moved across Mount Kemble Avenue, U.S. Route 202, to the newly built brick hospital building. All Souls' was set to close because of financial difficulties in the late 1960s. In 1973, it became Community Medical Center. In 1977, the center became bankrupt and was purchased by the then new and larger Morristown Memorial Hospital, which is now the Morristown Medical Center.

On December 18, 1843, the Bethel African Methodist Episcopal Church was incorporated. This was the first congregation established by blacks in Morris County. It is still active. The first site of the Church was located at 13 Spring Street and served as the only schoolhouse for colored children until 1870. The Church relocated to its present site at 59 Spring Street in 1874.

The first Jews moved to Morristown in the 1850s, but much larger numbers of Ashkenazi Jews migrated to the region from Eastern Europe in the 1890s, which led to the incorporation of the Morristown Jewish Center in 1899. Today there are several Jewish synagogues in Morristown reflecting the diversity of the community.

In the 1880s, the town's residents were primarily farmers. The small amount of stores in the Morristown Green town center were only open during the evening to accommodate farmers who did not leave their work during the daytime. There were only a few stores in town, including Adams & Fairchild grocers and P. H. Hoffman & Son clothiers, both located in the Arnold's Tavern on the Morristown Green.

Gilded Age of Morristown 

Starting in the mid-1800s, Morristown became a popular summer retreat for some of New York City's wealthiest residents. From the 1870s onwards, immense estates were built up along once rural thoroughfares; Madison Avenue, which runs along Morristown and Madison, New Jersey became known as "the street of the 100 millionaires" due to the sheer extravagance of the houses that were constructed.

Between 1880 and 1929, the Gilded Age of Morristown occurred, when dozens of "millionaires with large fortunes built their estates" in Morristown and Morris Township.

In the 1880 United States census, the town had 5,418 residents, which grew to 8,156 in 1890.

In 1889, Christian charity organization Market Street Mission was established on 9 Market Street beside the Morristown Green in response to the large number of saloons on Market Street. Beginning on March 18, 1889, the Mission hosted nightly meetings to aid and convert those with alcoholism, opioid use, and homelessness. As of 2022, the organization continues to operate a homeless shelter, meals, and emergency services, along with men's drug addiction recovery groups, community counseling, a chapel, and a thrift store.

The Morris Township describes the influx of millionaires:By 1896, an estimated 54 millionaires lived in the Morristown area, with a total wealth of $289,000,000, which [circa 2009] would be worth billions of dollars. Six years later in 1902, there were at least 91 millionaires.This included New York warehouse & grain broker Charles Grant Foster, who bought Union general Joseph Warren Revere's farm estate and mansion in 1881. This became Fosterfields, a Jersey cow farm. It was later managed by Caroline Rose Foster, though most of its herd was sold in a 1927 auction. In 1979 it was donated to the Morris County Park Commission. The site currently houses a living history museum and Revere's historic house.

In 1902, the New York Herald described Morristown as "the Millionaire City of the Nation." The Herald claimed it "contains the richest and least known colony of wealthy people in the world." It identified 45 millionaires (15 of whom were worth over $10 million) who had purchased country homes in Morristown to avoid "lavish display" and seek "freedom from notoriety." The newspaper named some of them including lawyer George Griswold Frelinghuysen, carpet-making heir Eugene Higgins, banker Otto Hermann Kahn, Luther Kountze, and Louis A. Thebaud.

Even smaller estates without deer herds, polo fields or private gas plants necessitated "multiple indoor and outdoor employees" such as "butlers, housekeeprs, parlor-maids and upstairs maids; governesses, nannies, and tutors; cooks and kitchen maids, coachmen, grooms, and stable boys; managers, care-takers, watchmen; gardeners and assistants."

The Gilded Age of Morristown ended in 1929, due to the "high cost of maintaining the estates, increasing income taxes, and the stock market crash" that led to the Great Depression. The Morris Township reports, "Many of the mansions were closed or sold, and some burned."

20th century to present 
Since 1929, more than 16,000 guide dogs for the blind from The Seeing Eye, Inc., the oldest such school in the U.S., have been trained on the streets of Morristown.

On January 5, 2009, five red lights were spotted in the Morristown area night skies, who gained significant press coverage and 9-1-1 calls. On April 1, 2009, the perpetrators revealed their hoax by publicizing footage of its creation, which consisted of helium balloons and flares. The event became nationally known as the Morristown UFO hoax.

Geography

According to the United States Census Bureau, Morristown town had a total area of 3.01 square miles (7.79 km2), including 2.91 square miles (7.53 km2) of land and 0.10 square miles (0.25 km2) of water (3.26%).

Morristown is completely surrounded by Morris Township, making it part of 21 pairs of "doughnut towns" in the state, where one municipality entirely surrounds another.

The downtown shopping and business district of Morristown is centered around a square park, known as the Morristown Green. It is a former market square from Morristown's colonial days.

Climate
Morristown has a humid continental climate (Köppen climate classification Dfa/Dfb) with hot, humid summers and moderately cold winters.

Demographics

2010 census

The Census Bureau's 2006–2010 American Community Survey showed that (in 2010 inflation-adjusted dollars) median household income was $64,279 (with a margin of error of +/− $5,628) and the median family income was $66,070 (+/− $3,638). Males had a median income of $51,242 (+/− $6,106) versus $44,315 (+/− $5,443) for females. The per capita income for the borough was $37,573 (+/− $2,286). About 10.2% of families and 9.5% of the population were below the poverty line, including 16.1% of those under age 18 and 8.8% of those age 65 or over.

2000 census
As of the 2000 United States census there were 18,544 people, 7,252 households, and 3,698 families residing in the town. The population density was 6,303.9 people per square mile (2,435.3/km2). There were 7,615 housing units at an average density of 2,588.7 per square mile (1,000.1/km2). The racial makeup of the town was 67.63% White, 16.95% Black or black, 0.22% Native American, 3.77% Asian, 0.06% Pacific Islander, 8.48% from other races, and 3.36% from two or more races. Hispanic or Latino people of any race were 27.15% of the population.

9.8% of Morristown residents identified themselves as being of Colombian American ancestry in the 2000 Census, the eighth- highest percentage of the population of any municipality in the United States. 4.5% of Morristown residents identified themselves as being of Honduran American ancestry in the 2000 Census, the sixth-highest percentage of the population of any municipality in the United States.

There were 7,252 households, out of which 22.5% had children under the age of 18 living with them, 34.4% were married couples living together, 12.0% had a female householder with no husband present, and 49.0% were non-families. 38.7% of all households were made up of individuals, and 10.2% had someone living alone who was 65 years of age or older. The average household size was 2.43 and the average family size was 3.19.

In the town, the population was spread out, with 18.4% under the age of 18, 8.8% from 18 to 24, 40.4% from 25 to 44, 20.0% from 45 to 64, and 12.4% who were 65 years of age or older. The median age was 35 years. For every 100 females, there were 100.6 males. For every 100 females age 18 and over, there were 99.7 males.

The median income for a household in the town was $57,563, and the median income for a family was $66,419. Males had a median income of $42,363 versus $37,045 for females. The per capita income for the town was $30,086. About 7.1% of families and 11.5% of the population were below the poverty line, including 11.5% of those under age 18 and 14.3% of those age 65 or over.

Economy

Companies based in Morristown include Capsugel, Covanta Energy, Louis Berger Group, Schindler Group and the Morristown & Erie Railway, a local short-line freight railway and Honeywell.

Morristown Medical Center, with 5,500 employees, is Morristown's largest employer. In a ruling issued in June 2015, Tax Court Judge Vito Bianco ruled that the hospital would be required to pay property taxes on nearly all of its campus in the town.

Arts and culture

Main sites 
 Morristown National Historical Park – Four historic sites around Morristown associated with the American Revolutionary War, including Jockey Hollow, a park that includes a visitor center, the Revolution-era Wick farm, encampment site of George Washington's Continental Army, and around 25 miles of hiking trails, and the Washington's Headquarters & Ford Mansion, a Revolution-era Georgian-style mansion used by George Washington as his headquarters during the Jockey Hollow encampment.
 Morristown Green – Park at the center of town which was the old town "common" or "green." It is the site of several Revolutionary War and Civil war monuments (including one with George Washington, Alexander Hamilton, and the Marquis De Lafayette discussing the arrival of French aid to the colonies), and is surrounded by historic churches, the colonial county-courthouse, and a shopping and restaurant district.
 St. Peter's Episcopal Church – Large McKim Mead and White church with bell tower, fine stained glass and medieval furnishings.
 Acorn Hall – 1853 Victorian Italianate mansion and home to the Morris County Historical Society. Donated to the historical society in 1971 by Mary Crane Hone, the mansion retained much of its original furnishings and accouterments as it remained in the same family for over a century. It is currently operated as a museum and is the headquarters of the Morris County Historical Society.
 Morris Museum – formally incorporated in 1943. The museum's permanent displays include rocks, minerals, fossils, animal mounts, a model railroad, and Native American crafts, pottery, carving, basketry and textiles.
 Mayo Performing Arts Center – a former Walter Reade movie theater originally constructed in 1937 that has been converted into a 1,302-seat performing arts center.
The Seeing Eye – the first school in North America for training and connecting guide dogs with blind and visually impaired students.
 Speedwell Ironworks – a National Historic Landmark and museum at the site where the electric telegraph was first presented to the public, on January 11, 1838.

Historic sites

Morristown is home to the following locations on the National Register of Historic Places:

 Acorn Hall – 68 Morris Avenue (added 1973)
 Boisaubin Manor – Southeast of Morristown on Treadwell Avenue (added 1976)
 Dr. Jabez Campfield House – 5 Olyphant Place (added 2008)
 Dr. Lewis Condict House – 51 South Street (added 1973)
 Cutler Homestead – 21 Cutler Street (added 1975)
 Delaware, Lackawanna and Western Railroad Station – 132 Morris Street (added 1980)
 Fordville – East of Morristown at 30 Ford Hill Road (added 1978)
 Glanville Blacksmith Shop – 47 Bank Street (added 1987)
 Jenkins-Mead House – 14 Revere Road (added 1997)
 Lindenwold – 247 South Street (added 1986)
 Timothy Mills House – 27 Mills Street (added 1975)
 Morris County Courthouse – Washington St. between Court Street and Western Avenue (added 1977)
 Morristown District – Roughly bounded by the cemetery, King Place, Madison and Colles Avenues., DeHart Street, and North Park Place (added 1973), Boundary Increase Irregularly bounded by Lackawanna, Franklin Place, James Street, Ogden Place, Doughty, Mt. Kemble, Western, and Speedwell Avenues (added 1986)
 Morristown National Historical Park – At junction of U.S. 202 and NJ 24 (added 1966)
 Morristown School – Junction of Whippany Road and Hanover Avenue, Morris Township (added 1996)
 Mount Kemble Home – 1 Mt. Kemble Avenue (added 1986)
 Thomas Nast Home – MacCulloch Avenue and Miller Road (added 1966)
 Normandy Park Historic District – Normandy Parkway, between Columbia Turnpike and Madison Avenue, Morris Township (added 1996)
 Oak Dell – Franklin Street and Madison Avenue (added 1986)
 Joseph W. Revere House – Northwest of Morristown on Mendham Avenue (added 1973), Fosterfields Boundary Increase at junction of Mendham and Kahdena Roads, Morris Township (added 1991)
 Speedwell Village-The Factory – 333 Speedwell Avenue (added 1974)
 Spring Brook House – 167 James Street (added 1986)
 Thorne and Eddy Estates – East of Morristown on Columbia Road (added 1978)
 Whippany Farm – 53 East Hanover Avenue (added 1977)
 Willow Hall – 330 Speedwell Avenue (added 2011)

Statues

 An equestrian statue of George Washington by the sculptor Frederick Roth is located near the Ford Mansion, Washington's Headquarters from December 1779 to June 1780 during the American Revolutionary War. It was dedicated on October 19, 1928, the anniversary of the surrender of British General Charles Cornwallis at Yorktown in 1781.
 A copy of The Hiker by Theo Alice Ruggles Kitson, commemorating the soldiers who fought in the Spanish–American War, was installed at the corner of Elm Street and Morris Avenue in 1948.
 One of only two heroic statues of Thomas Paine in the United States is located in Morristown; the other is found in Bordentown, NJ.
 One of the few statues depicting an unblindfolded Lady Justice adorns the façade of the Courthouse.
A statue of Morris Frank, the co-founder of The Seeing Eye guide dog school for the blind, and his dog Buddy stands in a corner of the green.
The Alliance (2007) by Brooklyn's Studio EIS, featuring bronze figures of George Washington, Alexander Hamilton and the Marquis de Lafayette. The statue is in the Morristown Green.

Sports
The New Jersey Stampede (formerly the Minutemen) are a professional inline hockey team that competes in the Professional Inline Hockey Association.

The United States Equestrian Team, the international equestrian team for the United States, was founded in 1950 at the Coates estate on van Beuren Road in Morristown.

Morristown has a cricketing club, the first in North America.

The Morristown 1776 Association Football Club is a soccer club that competes in the North Jersey Soccer League and MCSSA.

Government

Local government
Morristown is governed within the Faulkner Act, formally known as the Optional Municipal Charter Law, under a Plan F Mayor-Council system of New Jersey municipal government, which went into effect on January 1, 1974. The town is one of 71 municipalities (of the 564) statewide that use this form of government. The Morristown Town Council is comprised of seven members, of which three members are elected at-large representing the entire town and one representative is chosen from each of the town's four wards. Members are elected on a partisan basis to four-year terms of office on a staggered basis in odd-numbered years as part of the November general election, with the four ward seats up for vote together and the at-large and mayoral seats up for vote together two years later. As the legislative arm of the government, the council is responsible for making and setting policy for the town.

, the Mayor of Morristown is Democrat Timothy Dougherty, whose term of office ends December 31, 2025. Members of the Morristown Town Council are Council President Sandi Mayer (D; Ward IV, 2023), Council Vice President Nathan Umbriac (D; At Large, 2025), Stefan Armington (D, Ward III, 2023), Tawanna Cotten (D, Ward II, 2023), Toshiba Foster (D; At Large, 2025), Robert Iannaccone (I, Ward I, 2023), and David Silva (D; At Large, 2025).

In 2019, Mary Dougherty, wife of Mayor Tim Dougherty was criminally charged with accepting bribe money from Attorney Matt O'Donnell. Mary had been running for a seat on the Morris County Board of Chosen Freeholders in 2018 when O'Donnell offered her $10,000, presumably to help him get awarded more contracts from the county for legal work. In a plea agreement, Mary pled guilty in February 2021 to a reduced charge of falsifying a campaign finance report in exchange for dropping the bribery charge; she would face probation and a fine of $10,000.

Federal, state, and county representation

Morristown is located in the 11th Congressional District and is part of New Jersey's 25th state legislative district.

 

Morris County is governed by a Board of County Commissioners comprised of seven members who are elected at-large in partisan elections to three-year terms on a staggered basis, with either one or three seats up for election each year as part of the November general election. Actual day-to-day operation of departments is supervised by County Administrator, John Bonanni. , Morris County's Commissioners are
Commissioner Director Tayfun Selen (R, Chatham Township, term as commissioner ends December 31, 2023; term as director ends 2022),
Commissioner Deputy Director John Krickus (R, Washington Township, term as commissioner ends 2024; term as deputy director ends 2022),
Douglas Cabana (R, Boonton Township, 2022), 
Kathryn A. DeFillippo (R, Roxbury, 2022),
Thomas J. Mastrangelo (R, Montville, 2022),
Stephen H. Shaw (R, Mountain Lakes, 2024) and
Deborah Smith (R, Denville, 2024).
The county's constitutional officers are the County Clerk and County Surrogate (both elected for five-year terms of office) and the County Sheriff (elected for a three-year term). , they are 
County Clerk Ann F. Grossi (R, Parsippany–Troy Hills, 2023),
Sheriff James M. Gannon (R, Boonton Township, 2022) and
Surrogate Heather Darling (R, Roxbury, 2024).

Politics
As of June 2019, a total of 11,330 voters were registered in Morristown, of which 5,087 (44.9%) were Democrats, 2,208 (19.5%) Republicans, and 4,035 (35.6%) were registered as Unaffiliated.

Presidential elections
In the 2016 presidential election, Democrat Hillary Clinton received 67.4% of the vote (4,984 votes), ahead of Republican Donald Trump with 27.5% (2,033 votes), and other candidates with 5.1% (294 votes), among the 7,470 ballots cast by the town's 11,060 voters, for a turnout of 67.5%.

In the 2012 presidential election, Democrat Barack Obama received 67.1% of the vote (4,485 cast), ahead of Republican Mitt Romney with 31.7% (2,117 votes), and other candidates with 1.2% (79 votes), among the 6,727 ballots cast by the town's 10,212 registered voters (46 ballots were spoiled), for a turnout of 65.9%.

In the 2008 presidential election, Democrat Barack Obama received 68.1% of the vote (4,738 cast), ahead of Republican John McCain with 30.0% (2,084 votes) and other candidates with 1.0% (67 votes), among the 6,953 ballots cast by the town's 9,741 registered voters, for a turnout of 71.4%.

In the 2004 presidential election, Democrat John Kerry received 62.8% of the vote (4,138 ballots cast), outpolling Republican George W. Bush with 35.9% (2,370 votes) and other candidates with 0.5% (53 votes), among the 6,593 ballots cast by the town's 9,890 registered voters, for a turnout percentage of 66.7.

Gubernatorial elections
In the 2017 gubernatorial election, Democrat Phil Murphy received 68.44% of the vote (2,758 votes), ahead of Republican Kim Guadagno with 29.6% (1,194 votes), and other candidates with 1.9% (78 votes), among the 4,164 ballots cast by the town's 10,901 voters, for a turnout of 38.2%.

In the 2013 gubernatorial election, Republican Chris Christie received 52.7% of the vote (1,871 cast), ahead of Democrat Barbara Buono with 45.2% (1,602 votes), and other candidates with 2.1% (75 votes), among the 3,780 ballots cast by the town's 10,124 registered voters (232 ballots were spoiled), for a turnout of 37.3%.

In the 2009 gubernatorial election, Democrat Jon Corzine received 52.1% of the vote (2,263 ballots cast), ahead of Republican Chris Christie with 37.4% (1,623 votes), Independent Chris Daggett with 8.1% (350 votes) and other candidates with 0.4% (16 votes), among the 4,340 ballots cast by the town's 9,393 registered voters, yielding a 46.2% turnout.

Education

The Morris School District is a regional public school district that serves students in pre-kindergarten through twelfth grade from the communities of Morristown and Morris Township, and high school students (grades 9–12) from Morris Plains who attend the high school as part of a sending/receiving relationship with the Morris Plains Schools. As of the 2018–19 school year, the district, comprised of 10 schools, had an enrollment of 5,216 students and 441.4 classroom teachers (on an FTE basis), for a student–teacher ratio of 11.8:1. Schools in the district (with 2018–19 enrollment data from the National Center for Education Statistics) are 
Lafayette Learning Center (102 students; in grade Pre-K), 
Alexander Hamilton School (293; 3–5), 
Hillcrest School (288; K–2), 
Thomas Jefferson School (314; 3–5), 
Normandy Park School (302; K–5), 
Sussex Avenue School (301; 3–5), 
Alfred Vail School (297; K–2), 
Woodland School (289; K–2), 
Frelinghuysen Middle School (1,081; 6–8) and 
Morristown High School (1,860; 9–12). The nine elected seats on the board of education are allocated based on the population of the constituent municipalities, with four seats assigned to Morristown.

In addition to a public school system, Morristown has several private schools. Primary and elementary schools include The Red Oaks School, an independent private school founded in 1965 and serving pre-kindergarten through eighth grade, that offers both Montessori and International Baccalaureate programs. Assumption Roman Catholic is a grade school (K–8) that operates under the auspices of the Roman Catholic Diocese of Paterson and was one of 11 schools in the state recognized in 2014 by the United States Department of Education's National Blue Ribbon Schools Program. The Peck School, a private day school which serves approximately 300 students in kindergarten through grade eight, dates back to 1893 when it was originally established as Miss Sutphen's School.  The Delbarton School is an all-boys Roman Catholic school with approximately 540 students in grades seven through twelve, that began serving resident students in 1939 after having previously served as a seminary. The Morristown-Beard School, a private co-ed school formed from the merger of two previously existing institutions, Morristown Preparatory School and Miss Beard's School, serves grades 6 through 12. In addition, Villa Walsh Academy, a private Catholic college preparatory school conducted by the Religious Teachers Filippini, is located in Morristown.

The Academy of Saint Elizabeth was founded at Morristown in 1860 by the Sisters of Charity, however when municipal boundaries were redrawn in 1895, the academy found itself in the Convent Station section of the adjacent Morris Township.

The Rabbinical College of America, one of the largest Chabad Lubavitch Chasidic yeshivas in the world is located in Morristown. The Rabbinical College of America has a Baal Teshuva yeshiva for students of diverse Jewish backgrounds, named Yeshiva Tiferes Bachurim. The New Jersey Regional Headquarters for the worldwide Chabad Lubavitch movement is located on the campus.

Transportation

Roads and highways

Interstate 287 is the main highway providing access to Morristown. Two interchanges, Exit 35 and Exit 36, are located within the town. Other significant roads serving Morristown include U.S. Route 202, New Jersey Route 124 and County Route 510.

Public transportation
Morristown has attempted to implement transit-oriented development. Morristown was designated in 1999 as of one of New Jersey's first five "transit villages". In 1999, Morristown changed its zoning code to designate the area around the train station as a "Transit Village Core" for mixed-use. The designation was at least partly responsible for development plans for several mixed-use condominium developments.

NJ Transit offers rail service at the Morristown station which offers service on the Morristown Line to Newark Broad Street, Secaucus Junction, New York Penn Station and Hoboken Terminal. The town benefited from shortened commuting times to New York City due to the "Midtown Direct" service New Jersey Transit instituted in the 1990s.

NJ Transit local bus service is offered from the Morristown rail station, Morristown Medical Center and Headquarters Plaza on the 871, 872, 873, 874, 875 and 880 bus routes, replacing service that had been offered on the MCM1, MCM2, MCM3, MCM4, MCM8 and MCM10 routes until 2010, when subsidies to the local provider were eliminated as part of budget cuts.

Community Coach provides daily service between New York City and Morristown on bus route 77.

The town's Department of Public Works operates "Colonial Coach", which provides free transportation within Morristown.

The Whippany Line of the Morristown and Erie Railway, a small freight line, traverses the township. Established in 1895, the line runs from Morristown and runs through East Hanover Township and Hanover Township to Roseland.

Aviation
Morristown Municipal Airport is the closest public airport. While owned by the town, the airport is physically located in nearby Hanover Township, 3 miles east of Morristown proper.

Newark Liberty International Airport in Newark / Elizabeth is the closest airport with scheduled passenger service. It is approximately 20 minutes away via Route 24 and Interstate 78.

Media
Due to its proximity to New York City and Newark, daily newspapers serving the community are The New York Times, The Wall Street Journal, and The Star-Ledger.

The Morristown Daily Record is published locally, as is New Jersey Monthly magazine.

WMTR is an AM radio station at 1250 kHz is licensed to Morristown. The station features an oldies format.

WJSV radio (90.5 FM) is the nonprofit radio station of Morristown High School, which also has a television show, Colonial Corner.

Hometown Tales, a public-access television show and podcast chronicling stories and urban legends from around the world, is loosely based in Morristown.

Notable people

People who were born in, residents of, or otherwise closely associated with Morristown include:

 Frank D. Abell (1878–1964), politician who served in the New Jersey General Assembly in 1925 and 1926 and the New Jersey Senate from 1926 to 1931
 Kenny Agostino (born 1992), professional ice hockey player for the New Jersey Devils of the National Hockey League
 Joseph Bushnell Ames (1878–1928), novelist
 Kristina Apgar (born 1985), actress best known for her portrayal of Lily Smith on the CW's drama Privileged
 Michael Ashkin (born 1955), artist known for sculptures, videos, photographs and installations depicting marginalized, desolate landscapes
 William O. Baker (1915–2005), scientist who headed Bell Labs
 Bonnie Lee Bakley (1956–2001), murdered wife of Robert Blake; born in Morristown
 James Berardinelli (born 1967), film critic
 Vincenzo Bernardo (born 1990), professional soccer player
 Faire Binney (1900–1957), stage and film actress who starred in films during the silent era after making her debut in the 1918 film Sporting Life alongside her sister Constance Binney
 Anna Campbell Bliss (1925–2015), visual artist and architect
 Scott Blumstein (born 1992), poker player who won the 2017 World Series of Poker Main Event for $8,150,000
 Warren Bobrow (born ), mixologist, chef, and writer known as the "Cocktail Whisperer"
 Rinker Buck (born 1950), author best known for his 1997 memoir Flight of Passage
 Tez Cadey (born 1993), French-American DJ, record producer and songwriter
 Jabez Campfield (1737–1821), doctor who served as a surgeon in the Continental Army during the American Revolutionary War
 Lincoln Child (born 1957), author of techno-thriller and horror novels
 George T. Cobb (1813–1870), represented New Jersey's 4th congressional district from 1861 to 1863, and Mayor of Morristown from 1865 to 1869
 Lewis Condict (1772–1862), physician and member of the United States House of Representatives from New Jersey
 Silas Condict (1738–1801), farmer, surveyor and landowner, who served as a delegate to the Continental Congress from New Jersey
 Donald Cresitello, Mayor of Morristown from 2006 to 2010
 Augustus W. Cutler (1827–1897), member of the United States House of Representatives from New Jersey
 Jean Dalrymple (1902–1998), theater producer, manager, publicist and playwright, who was instrumental in the founding of New York City Center
 Joe Dante (born 1946), film director
 Edith Kunhardt Davis (1937–2020), author of more than 70 children's books.
 Alex DeCroce (1936–2012), politician who served in the New Jersey General Assembly, where he represented the 26th Legislative District from 1989 until his death
 Dorothy Harrison Eustis (1886–1946), dog breeder, philanthropist, founder of The Seeing Eye guide dog school
 Caroline C. Fillmore (1813–1881), wife of President Millard Fillmore; born in Morristown
 Nic Fink (born 1993), Olympic swimmer who specializes in breaststroke events
 Chris Fletcher (born 1948), former safety, played in the NFL for the San Diego Chargers, 1970–1976
 Steve Forbes (born 1947), editor-in-chief of Forbes and two-time Republican candidate for President of the United States
 Caroline Rose Foster (1877–1979), farmer and founder of Fosterfields, a working historical farm
 Justin Fox (born 1964), financial journalist, commentator, and writer.
 Adam Gardner (born 1973), singer, songwriter, and guitarist of the band Guster
 Samuel Hazard Gillespie Jr. (1910–2011), former U.S. Attorney for the Southern District of New York
 Justin Gimelstob (born 1977), professional tennis player
 Anna Harrison (1775–1864), First Lady of the United States, wife of President William Henry Harrison and grandmother of President Benjamin Harrison
 Tobin Heath (born 1988), United States national soccer team player and member of the female professional team Portland Thorns FC
 Markus Howard (born 1999), player for the Marquette Golden Eagles men's basketball team
 Linda Hunt (born 1945), Academy Award-winning actress
 Julia Hurlbut (1882–1962), suffragist who served as the vice chairman of the New Jersey branch of the National Woman's Party
 I. Stanford Jolley (1900–1978), film and television actor who starred in the 1946 serial film The Crimson Ghost
 Otto Hermann Kahn (1867–1934), German-born banker, investor, philanthropist and Rutgers University trustee maintained a home in Morristown
 Roger Wolfe Kahn (1907–1962), bandleader, composer, nightclub owner, aviator; Otto Kahn's son; born in Morristown
 Nolan Kasper (born 1989), World Cup alpine ski racer who competes in the technical events and specializes in the slalom
 Ann Klein (1923–1986), politician who served in the New Jersey General Assembly and was the first woman to run for Governor of New Jersey
 Anthony W. Knapp (born 1941), mathematician at the Stony Brook University working on representation theory who classified the tempered representations of a semisimple Lie group
 Ted Koffman (born 1944), politician who served in the Maine House of Representatives from 2000 to 2008
 Luther Kountze (1841–1918), banker who built an estate in Morristown in the late 1880s
 Diane Kress (born 1959), author
 Dorothy Kunhardt (1901–1979), children's-book author, best known for the baby book Pat the Bunny.
 Connor Lade (born 1989), soccer player for New York Red Bulls
 Antoine le Blanc (–1833), murderer
 Fran Lebowitz (born 1950), author, columnist and actor
 David Hunter McAlpin (1816–1901), prominent industrialist and real estate owner in New York City
 Dimitri Minakakis (born 1977), former singer for mathcore band The Dillinger Escape Plan
 Dave Moore (born 1969), former NFL tight end
 Troy Murphy (born 1980), professional basketball player
 Walter Naegle (born 1949), artist, photography and civil rights activist born in Morristown. Partner of Bayard Rustin.  
 Thomas Nast (1840–1902), caricaturist and editorial cartoonist; lived in Morristown for more than 20 years
 Craig Newmark (born 1952), founder of Craigslist; born in Morristown and attended Morristown High School
 Neil O'Donnell (born 1966), former NFL quarterback, most notably for the Pittsburgh Steelers
 John Panelli (1926–2012), football player who played in the NFL for the Detroit Lions and the Chicago Cardinals
 Sister Parish (1910–1994), interior decorator and socialite, most notably as the first interior designer brought in to decorate the Kennedy White House
 Doug Payne (born 1981, class of 2000), American equestrian who was selected to compete for the United States in the delayed 2020 Summer Games in Tokyo
 Mahlon Pitney (1858–1924), Associate Justice of the United States Supreme Court
 Johanna Poethig (born 1956), Bay Area visual, public and performance artist
 Debra Ponzek, chef, owner of Aux Délices restaurants in Connecticut
 Rick Porcello (born 1988), starting pitcher for the Boston Red Sox
 Andrew Prendeville (born 1981), professional automobile racer
 Sarah Price (born 1969), author
 Dan Quinn (born 1970), football defensive coordinator for the Super Bowl XLVIII champion Seattle Seahawks, former head coach of the Atlanta Falcons in Super Bowl LI and current defensive coordinator for the Dallas Cowboys
 Robert Randolph, guitarist, of Robert Randolph & the Family Band
 Rocky Rees (born 1949), head football coach at Shippensburg University of Pennsylvania, 1990–2010
 Garrett Reisman (born 1968), NASA astronaut, first American to be on board the International Space Station
 Rick Rescorla (1939–2001), head of Morgan Stanley World Trade Center security during the September 11 terrorist attacks
 Jordan Riak (1935–2016), activist against corporal punishment
 William P. Richardson (1864–1945), co-founder and first Dean of Brooklyn Law School
 Suzanne Scott (born 1965/66), CEO of Fox News
 Tony Scott (1921–2007), bebop clarinetist, arranger, New World music innovator
 Gene Shalit (born 1932), film critic on NBC's The Today Show
 Alexander Slobodyanik (1941–2008), classical pianist
 Leila Clement Spaulding (1878–1973), classicist and archaeologist
 Lexington Steele (born 1969), pornographic actor, director and owner of Mercenary Motion Pictures and Black Viking Pictures
 John Cleves Symmes (1742–1814), delegate to the Continental Congress; pioneer responsible for the Symmes Purchase; father-in-law of President William Henry Harrison
 Kathryn Tappen (born 1981), sportscaster who works on NBC Sports Group's coverage of hockey and football
 Jahmar Thorpe (born 1984), professional basketball player for the Iwate Big Bulls in Japan
 Jyles Tucker (born 1983), linebacker for the San Diego Chargers
 Bayard Tuckerman Jr. (1889–1974), jockey, businessman and politician
 MJ Tyson (born 1986), jewelry designer.
 Alfred Vail (1807–1859), inventor of Morse code
 Frederick T. van Beuren Jr. (1876–1943), physician and surgeon who was president of Morristown Memorial Hospital from 1933 until his death.
 Tom Verlaine (born 1949), songwriter, guitarist, and lead singer for the New York rock band Television
 Daniel Spader Voorhees (1852–1935), New Jersey State Treasurer, 1907–1913
 John Beam Vreeland (1852–1923), attorney and politician who served in the New Jersey Senate and as the United States Attorney for the district of New Jersey.
 Silas A. Wade (1797–1869), politician who served in the Michigan House of Representatives
 Joshua Weinstein (born 1983), independent filmmaker who directed the A24 film Menashe (2017), and the feature documentaries Driver's Wanted (2012) and Flying on One Engine (2008)
 George Theodore Werts (1846–1910), 28th Governor of New Jersey, 1893–1896; Mayor of Morristown 1886–1892
 Nancy Zeltsman (born 1958), jazz vibraphonist

References

External links

 Official website
 "Where the People Live"
 The Morristown & Morris Township Public Library
 

 
1865 establishments in New Jersey
County seats in New Jersey
Faulkner Act (mayor–council)
Populated places established in 1865
Towns in Morris County, New Jersey